Rajendra Bhatia (born 1952) is an Indian mathematician, author, and educator. He is currently a professor of mathematics at Ashoka University located in Sonipat, Haryana ,India.

Education 
He studied at the University of Delhi, where he completed his BSc degree in physics and MSc degree in mathematics, and moved to the Indian Statistical Institute, Kolkata, where he completed his Ph.D. in 1982 under the probabilist K. R. Parthasarathy.

Research
Bhatia's research interests include matrix inequalities, calculus of matrix functions, means of matrices, and connections between harmonic analysis, geometry and matrix analysis.

He is one of the eponyms of the Bhatia–Davis inequality.

Academic life
Rajendra Bhatia founded the series Texts and Readings in Mathematics in 1992  and the series Culture and History of Mathematics on the history of Indian mathematics. He has served on the editorial boards of several major international journals such as Linear Algebra and Its Applications, and the SIAM Journal on Matrix Analysis and Applications.

Awards 
Bhatia was awarded the INSA Medal for Young Scientists in 1982. He won the Shanti Swarup Bhatnagar Prize for Science and Technology in Mathematical Science in 1995. In 2017 he was awarded the Hans Schneider Prize in Linear Algebra.

Books

See also
Bhatia–Davis inequality

References

External links
A Brief History of Fourier Series by Prof. Rajendra Bhatia
 

1952 births
Living people
20th-century Indian mathematicians
21st-century Indian mathematicians
Indian Statistical Institute alumni
Academic staff of the Indian Statistical Institute
Fellows of the Indian National Science Academy
Fellows of the Indian Academy of Sciences
Recipients of the Shanti Swarup Bhatnagar Award in Mathematical Science